Najafabad (also Romanized as Najafābād) is a village in Bala Deh Rural District, Beyram District, Larestan County, Fars Province, Iran. At the 2006 census, its population was 130, in 31 families.

References 

Populated places in Larestan County